Sheddrick Roderica Wilson (born November 23, 1973) is a former professional American football wide receiver. He was signed by the Houston Oilers as an undrafted free agent in 1996 and was also a member of the Barcelona Dragons. Wilson played college football for Louisiana State University (LSU).

References

External links
 LSU Tigers profile

1973 births
Living people
American football wide receivers
Barcelona Dragons players
Houston Oilers players
LSU Tigers football players
People from Thomasville, Georgia
Players of American football from Georgia (U.S. state)